In enzymology, an arginine—tRNA ligase is an enzyme that catalyzes the chemical reaction

ATP + L-arginine + tRNAArg  AMP + diphosphate + L-arginyl-tRNAArg

The 3 substrates of this enzyme are ATP, L-arginine, and tRNA(Arg), whereas its 3 products are AMP, diphosphate, and L-arginyl-tRNA(Arg).

This enzyme belongs to the family of ligases, to be specific those forming carbon-oxygen bonds in aminoacyl-tRNA and related compounds.  The systematic name of this enzyme class is L-arginine:tRNAArg ligase (AMP-forming). Other names in common use include arginyl-tRNA synthetase, arginyl-transfer ribonucleate synthetase, arginyl-transfer RNA synthetase, arginyl transfer ribonucleic acid synthetase, arginine-tRNA synthetase, and arginine translase.  This enzyme participates in arginine and proline metabolism and aminoacyl-trna biosynthesis.

It contains a conserved domain at the N terminus called arginyl tRNA synthetase N terminal domain or additional domain 1 (Add-1). This domain is about 140 residues long and it has been suggested that it is involved in tRNA recognition.

Structural studies

References

Further reading
 
 
 

Protein domains
EC 6.1.1
Enzymes of known structure